LaRue was an American Christian music band formed by siblings Phillip and Natalie LaRue. The singer-songwriter duo originated in Nashville, Tennessee in 2000. Phillip was 17 and Natalie 15 when they came out with their first album LaRue.

The band worked together for a period of nearly three years before they broke up. According to Natalie LaRue, this was because of family reasons. A few years later both pursued solo musical careers.

Band members 
 Phillip LaRue - vocals, guitar
 Natalie LaRue - vocals

History 
Home-schooled as teenagers, Philip's passion for playing the guitar and Natalie's for singing brought them closer. They began writing and composing songs together. They performed in local groups and churches and were encouraged to pursue a musical career. Motivated by this, the duo recorded a demo CD with the help of a local producer. It was then sent to some Christian music executives and was accepted by the Reunion label. The family then moved from Phoenix to Nashville, where the duo worked together on their first album. On February 8, 2000, their debut album LaRue was released with the songs having a Christian-alternative vibe. The band began leaning towards alternative rock as their third and final album Reaching came out. Released October 8, 2002, it depicted the harmony in the band's voice and was critically acclaimed.

After this, however, both got married and decided it would best to focus on family life. After a short break, however, they pursued solo musical careers.

Discography

As LaRue

From Phillip LaRue

From Natalie LaRue

Compilation contributions 
Left Behind: The Movie Soundtrack (2000) - "Fly" (from Transparent)
Soul Lift (Flicker, 2001) - "He Is Lord", "King Of My Life" (Natalie with T-Bone)
The Message: Psalms (eb+flo, 2005) - "How Faithful You Are (Psalm 89)" by Phillip LaRue; "Who Can Compare With God (Psalm 113)" by Natalie LaRue

Tours
 Rebecca St. James' Transform Tour with Tree63 and FuseBox

References

External links 
 Phillip at MySpace
 LaRue at christianitytoday.com
 LaRue at Jesus Freak Hideout

Interviews 
 Jesus Freak Hideout interview
 Best of friends
 Where Are You, God?

American pop music groups
Christian pop groups
Sibling musical duos
Musical groups established in 1999
1999 establishments in the United States